Lauricocha (possibly from in the Quechua spelling Lawriqucha;lawri bluish, Quechua qucha lake, lagoon, "bluish lake") is a lake in the Cordillera Blanca in the Andes of  Peru. It is located in the Ancash Region, Asunción Province, Chacas District. Lauricocha lies south-west of the lake Yanacocha, south of Paqarisha Lake and north-east of the mountain Pomabamba.

References 

Lakes of Peru
Lakes of Ancash Region